Azizur Rahman is a male Muslim given name, meaning dear to the Most Gracious. It may refer to:

 Azizur Rahman (poet) (1917–1978), a Bangladeshi poet and lyricist
 Azizur Rahman Mallick, known as A R Mallick (1918–1997), Bangladeshi historian and educationist
 Shah Azizur Rahman (1925-1988), Bangladeshi politician who served as the Prime Minister of Bangladesh
 Azizur Rahman (film director) (1939–2022), Bangladeshi film director, cinematographer, art director and screenwriter
 Azizur Rahman (Bangladeshi politician) (1943–2020), Bangladesh Awami League politician from Maulvibazar
 Aziz-ur-Rehman (cricketer, born 1959), Pakistani cricketer and umpire
 Aziz-ur-Rehman (cricketer, born 1966), Pakistani cricketer
 Aziz ur-Rahman, known as Bangla Bhai (1970–2007), Bangladeshi Islamist insurgent

Arabic masculine given names